2014 Orange Bowl can refer to:

 2014 Orange Bowl (January), played as part of the 2013–14 college football bowl season between the Clemson Tigers and the Ohio State Buckeyes
 2014 Orange Bowl (December), played as part of the 2014–15 college football bowl season between the Georgia Tech Yellow Jackets and the Mississippi State Bulldogs